The Hour and Turn of Augusto Matraga is a 1965 Brazilian crime drama film directed by Roberto Santos, based on the short story of the same name by João Guimarães Rosa.

Cast
 Leonardo Villar as Augusto Matraga
 Joffre Soares as Joaozinho Bem Bem
 Maria Ribeiro as Dionorá
 Maurício do Valle as Priest
 Flávio Migliaccio as Quim Recadeiro
 Solano Trindade
 Antonio Carnera as Major Consilvo
 Ivan De Souza as Jurumim
 Emmanuel Cavalcanti as João Lomba

Reception
The film won the Best Film Award and Leonardo Villar won the Best Actor Award at the 1st Festival de Brasília. It was entered into the 1966 Cannes Film Festival.

References

External links
 

1965 crime drama films
1965 films
1960s Portuguese-language films
Brazilian black-and-white films
Brazilian crime drama films
Films based on short fiction
Films based on works by João Guimarães Rosa
Films directed by Roberto Santos